Morrison Academy Kaohsiung (MAK) is a K–12 Christian International school in Dashe District, Kaohsiung, Taiwan. It is the southern satellite school of the Morrison Academy school system.

The school is jointly accredited by the Western Association of Schools and Colleges and the Association of Christian Schools International.

Campus 
Following its establishment, the campus moved twice. The current MAK campus is located in Dashe District, a suburban district of Kaohsiung City, about a 20-minute drive from downtown Kaohsiung. The campus was built in 2000 on land leased from the Taiwan Sugar Corporation.

MAK facilities include:
20 classrooms equipped with LCD projectors, TVs, Chromecast, and Apple TVs
two music rooms ready for band and strings Orchestra
a library
a computer lab and multi-media lab
two science labs
an air-conditioned, indoor gymnasium
an outdoor basketball/volleyball court
two soccer fields
a 300-meter sand-and-concrete track
a weight/fitness room
an outdoor covered play area
a makerspace and tinker lab

Student Body 
The K-12 enrollment at MAK is about 380 (as of 2019). The faculty to student ratio is about 1:5.

History 
Morrison Christian Academy started over 50 years ago in Taichung in a bamboo hut with six children.  Soon after its inception missionary groups quickly got organized and expanded this school to a whopping thirty-five students, and named their creation after Robert Morrison, the first Protestant missionary to Mainland China.

In Kaohsiung, many missionary kids went to the U.S. Department of Defense School, but when it closed in 1974, they were without a school.  Morrison Academy stepped in to fill that need and opened a K-8 school (called Morrison Academy Kaohsiung) near Cheng Ching Lake.  In two years, it grew from three teachers and thirty-three students to four teachers and forty-five students.  Missionary kids kept coming, and they built a six-classroom school at Kao Tan to hold them all.  Even this school, however, could not hold the growing enrollment, so they moved again in 1996, back to Cheng Ching Lake and shared a campus with the Da Hua Elementary School in Fengshan. In 2000, they opened the current MAK campus.

See also
 Education in Taiwan

References

Christian schools in Taiwan
American international schools in Taiwan
International schools in Kaohsiung
Morrison Academy